The Mauve egg is a jewelled Easter egg made under the supervision of the Russian jeweller Peter Carl Fabergé in 1897, for Nicholas II of Russia, who presented it to his mother, the Dowager Empress Maria Feodorovna on April 18, 1897.

One of six imperial Fabergé eggs which are currently lost, Fabergé billed Nicholas II for the egg, described as a "mauve enamel egg, with 3 miniatures" on May 17, 1897 for 3,250 rubles.

Surprise

The surprise is a heart shaped photo frame that opened as a three-leaf clover with each leaf containing three miniature portraits of Nicholas II, his wife, the Empress Alexandra Fyodorovna, and their first child, Grand Duchess Olga Nikolaevna. It was made of rose-cut diamonds, strawberry red, green and white enamel, pearls and watercolour on ivory. The surprise is now on display in the Fabergé Museum in Saint Petersburg, Russia.

See also
Egg decorating
List of missing treasure

References

Sources

External links

 Description at wintraecken.nl

Lost Fabergé eggs
1897 works
Imperial Fabergé eggs